Róbert Kővári (born 23 November 1995) is a Hungarian football player who plays for Szeged-Csanád.

Club statistics

Updated to games played as of 1 September 2019.

External links
 HLSZ 
 MLSZ 
 

1995 births
Living people
People from Szekszárd
Hungarian footballers
Hungary youth international footballers
Association football midfielders
Pécsi MFC players
Paksi FC players
Dorogi FC footballers
Soproni VSE players
BFC Siófok players
Szeged-Csanád Grosics Akadémia footballers
Nemzeti Bajnokság I players
Nemzeti Bajnokság II players
Sportspeople from Tolna County